The wedding of King Constantine II of Greece and Princess Anne-Marie of Denmark took place on Friday, 18 September 1964, at the Metropolitan Cathedral of Athens. Constantine II was the reigning Greek monarch, while Princess Anne-Marie was the youngest daughter of King Frederick IX of Denmark and Queen Ingrid. It was the second, and to date, the last wedding of a reigning Greek monarch to be held in Greece.

Engagement
The couple, third cousins through both Queen Victoria of the United Kingdom and King Christian IX of Denmark, first met in 1959 when then Crown Prince Constantine accompanied his parents on a state visit to Denmark. Princess Anne-Marie was just 13 at the time. They met again in 1961, and in 1962, Anne-Marie was a bridesmaid at the wedding of Constantine's older sister, Princess Sophia, to Infante Juan Carlos of Spain. In 1962, Princess Anne-Marie was on holiday with her governess in Norway, where Crown Prince Constantine was attending a yacht racing event. He proposed and she accepted. King Frederick IX initially withheld his consent, as Anne-Marie was only 15 at the time, but eventually relented on the conditions that she finish her education and the wedding not be held before her 18th birthday.

On 23 January 1963, the Danish royal court announced the engagement. The wedding was initially set for January 1965. Following the death of King Paul on 6 March 1964, the date was moved forward.

Pre-wedding celebrations

In Denmark
The celebrations began in early September 1964. On 7 September, Constantine II arrived in Denmark where a private dinner was held at Fredensborg Palace. The next day, there was a gala performance at the Royal Danish Theatre followed by a banquet at Christiansborg Palace. The next morning, a reception was held at Copenhagen City Hall.

In Greece
King Constantine II, Princess Anne-Marie, King Frederick IX, Queen Ingrid, Princess Margrethe and Princess Benedikte sailed to Greece on board the Danish royal yacht Dannebrog. A reception was held in honour of the Danish royal family at the Hotel Grande Bretagne.

On 16 September, most of the royal guests arrived in Greece by plane. That evening, a gala was held at the Royal Palace for 1,600 invited guests.

Wedding
Constantine and Anne-Marie were married on 18 September 1964, two weeks after Anne-Marie's 18th birthday.

Ceremony
The marriage ceremony took place in the Greek Orthodox Metropolitan Cathedral of Athens, and was conducted by Chrysostomos II, Archbishop of Athens and All Greece.

Attire
Princess Anne-Marie wore a relatively unadorned gown by Danish designer, Holger Blom, assisted by Jørgen Bender. Her Irish lace veil, worn by her maternal grandmother, Princess Margaret of Connaught at her own wedding in 1905, was anchored by a Cartier diamond tiara given to Princess Margaret by the Khedive of Egypt. The veil had also been worn by her mother, Queen Ingrid, in 1935. The veil and tiara together have been worn by all of Ingrid's female descendants.

King Constantine II wore the ceremonial uniform of field marshal of the Hellenic Army. He wore the riband and star of the Order of the Redeemer as well as all his other medals and decorations.

Attendants

Bridesmaids
 Princess Anne of the United Kingdom
 Princess Christina of Sweden
 Princess Irene of Greece and Denmark
 Princess Margareta of Romania 
 Princess Clarissa of Hesse
 Princess Tatiana Radziwiłł

Crown bearers
 The Crown Prince of Norway
 The Crown Prince of Sweden
 Crown Prince Alexander of Yugoslavia
 The Prince of Wales
 Prince Michael of Greece and Denmark
 Prince Ingolf of Denmark
 Prince Michael of Kent
 Prince Karl of Hesse
 Count Michael Bernadotte af Wisborg

Guests
The wedding was attended by 1200 guests from around the world. As both the bride and groom were descendants of Victoria of the United Kingdom and Christian IX of Denmark, they were closely related to almost all of the royal houses in Europe, many of whom were in attendance.

Relatives of the bride

House of Glücksburg
 The King and Queen of Denmark, the bride's parents
 Princess Margrethe of Denmark, the bride's sister
 Princess Benedikte of Denmark, the bride's sister
 Princess Caroline-Mathilde of Denmark, the bride's paternal aunt by marriage
 Prince Ingolf of Denmark, the bride's first cousin
 Prince Christian of Denmark, the bride’s first cousin
 Prince Viggo, Count of Rosenborg and Princess Viggo, Countess of Rosenborg, the bride's first cousin twice removed and his wife 
 Princess Margaret of Denmark, the bride's first cousin twice removed
 Princess Axel of Denmark, the bride's first cousin once removed (also widow of the bride's first cousin twice removed)
 Prince George Valdemar and Princess Anne of Denmark, the bride's second cousin and his wife

House of Bernadotte
 The King of Sweden, the bride's maternal grandfather
 Prince Gustaf Adolf, Duke of Västerbotten's family:
 Princess Christina of Sweden, the bride's first cousin
 The Crown Prince of Sweden, the bride's first cousin
 Count Sigvard Bernadotte of Wisborg's family:
 Count Michael Bernadotte of Wisborg, the bride's first cousinRelatives of the groom
House of Glücksburg
 Queen Frederica of Greece, the groom's mother The Princess and Prince of Asturias, the groom's sister and brother-in-law Princess Irene of Greece and Denmark, the groom's sister Queen Mother Helen of Romania, the groom's paternal aunt King Michael I and Queen Anne of Romania, the groom's paternal first cousin and the bride and groom's mutual second cousin once removed Princess Margareta of Romania, the groom's paternal first cousin once removed Princess Irene, Duchess of Aosta, the groom's paternal aunt The Duke and Duchess of Aosta, the groom's paternal first cousin and his wife Princess Katherine of Greece and Denmark and Major Richard Brandram, the groom's paternal aunt and uncle Queen Alexandra of Yugoslavia's family: Crown Prince Alexander of Yugoslavia, the groom's paternal first cousin once removed Princess Eugénie, Duchess of Castel Duino and The Duke of Castel Duino, the groom's first cousin once removed, and her husband Princess Tatiana Radziwiłł, the groom's second cousin Prince Jerzy Radziwiłł,  the groom's second cousin Princess Paul of Yugoslavia, the groom's paternal first cousin once removed 
 Princess Marina, Duchess of Kent, the groom's paternal first cousin once removed, and the bride's paternal second cousin once removed Princess Alexandra, The Hon. Mrs. Ogilvy and The Hon. Angus Ogilvy, the groom's paternal second cousin (also the bride and groom's mutual third cousin) and her husband Prince Michael of Kent, the groom's paternal second cousin (also the bride and groom's mutual third cousin) Princess Andrew of Greece and Denmark, the groom's paternal grandaunt by marriage The Dowager Princess of Hohenlohe-Langenburg, the groom's first cousin once removed The Prince of Hohenlohe-Langenburg, the groom's second cousin The Duke of Edinburgh, the groom's paternal first cousin once removed (representing the Queen of the United Kingdom)
 The Prince of Wales, the groom's paternal second cousin The Princess Anne, the groom's paternal second cousin Prince Michael of Greece and Denmark, the groom's paternal first cousin once removedHouse of Hanover
 The Duchess of Brunswick, the groom's maternal grandmother Prince and Princess George William of Hanover, the groom's maternal uncle and aunt (and the groom's first cousin, once removed and her husband) Prince Karl of Hesse, the groom's second cousin Princess Clarissa of Hesse, the groom's second cousinOther royal guests
 The King and Queen of the Belgians, the bride's second cousin and his wife The Queen and Prince Consort of the Netherlands, the bride's first cousin twice removed, and her husband Princess Beatrix of the Netherlands, the bride's second cousin once removed The King of Norway, the bride's paternal first cousin once removed The Crown Prince of Norway, the bride's paternal second cousin The Earl Mountbatten of Burma, the bride and groom's mutual second cousin once removed King Umberto II and Queen Marie-José of Italy, the bride and groom's mutual third cousin twice removed The Prince of Naples, the bride and groom's mutual fourth cousin once removed 
 Princess Maria Gabriella of Savoy, the bride and groom's mutual fourth cousin once removed 
 Princess Maria Beatrice of Savoy, the bride and groom's mutual fourth cousin once removed 
 Tsar Simeon II and Tsarista Margarita of Bulgaria, the bride and groom's mutual fourth cousin once removed, and his wife The Count and Countess of Barcelona, the bride and groom's mutual second cousin once removed, and his wife (also parents of the groom's brother-in-law) Infanta Pilar of Spain, the bride and groom's mutual third cousin Prince Carlos, Duke of Calabria 
 Infante Alfonso, Duke of Galliera
 The Hereditary Grand Duke and Hereditary Grand Duchess of Luxembourg, the bride's second cousin and her husband The Prince and Princess of Prussia, the groom's maternal first cousin once removed, and his wife''
 The Prince and Princess of Liechtenstein
 The Prince and Princess of Monaco 
 The Duke and Duchess of Württemberg
 The Duke and Duchess of Braganza
 The King and Queen of Thailand
 The King and Princess Muna al-Hussein of Jordan
 Queen Farida of Egypt

Other notable guests
 Lynda Bird Johnson

References

Greece
Greece
1960s in Athens
1964 in Greece
September 1964 events in Europe
Greek monarchy
Constantine II of Greece